15 Trianguli is a suspected variable star located in the northern constellation Triangulum, with an apparent magnitude of 5.4 making it faintly visible to the naked eye under ideal conditions, although it is suspected of being an irregular variable with a range of 0.14 magnitudes.

15 Trianguli has a stellar classification of M3 III. It has 1.7 times the mass of the Sun and 118 times the radius of the Sun. It is an asymptotic giant branch star, which means it is fusing hydrogen and helium in separate shells around an inert carbon core.

References

M-type giants
Triangulum (constellation)
Trianguli, 15
016058
012086
0750
Durchmusterung objects